The National Register of Historic Places contains a listing for a Holly Grove Site, also known as Beaver Dam Archeological Site or 22-Pa-524, which is a  archeological site near Sledge, Mississippi, in Panola County, Mississippi.  It was listed on the National Register of Historic Places in 1976.

At least one other, different NRHP-listed archeological site is also named "Holly Grove": the site also known as Black Site or 22-Lf-539, in Leflore County, Mississippi.

References

Archaeological sites on the National Register of Historic Places in Mississippi
Geography of Panola County, Mississippi
National Register of Historic Places in Panola County, Mississippi